The Winter Guest  is a 1997 drama film directed by Alan Rickman and starring Phyllida Law and Emma Thompson.

Plot
Set in Scotland on one wintry day, the film focuses on eight  people; a mother and daughter, Elspeth (Phyllida Law) and Frances (Emma Thompson); two young boys skipping school, Sam (Douglas Murphy) and Tom (Sean Biggerstaff); two old women who frequently attend strangers' funerals, Chloe (Sandra Voe) and Lily (Sheila Reid); and two teenagers Nita (Arlene Cockburn) and Alex (Gary Hollywood). The film consists primarily of the interactions between the characters.

History
The film is based on Sharman MacDonald's play, premiered at the West Yorkshire Playhouse (in the Quarry studio theatre, 23 January to 18 February 1995) before transferring to the Almeida Theatre in London (14 March to 15 April 1995).

Like the film it was also directed by Rickman, starring Law, Reid, Voe and John Wark, with Siân Thomas in the role of Frances, played in the film by Emma Thompson.

Much of the film was shot in around Pittenweem in Fife.

Reception
The film was met warmly by critics, with Thompson winning an award at the Venice Film Festival.

In the United Kingdom, it grossed £250,689, and a worldwide total of $1.3 million.

Awards and nominations
British Independent Film Awards (UK)
Nominated: Best British Actress (Emma Thompson)
Brussels International Film Festival (Belgium)
Won: Audience Award (Alan Rickman)
Chicago Film Festival (USA)
Won: Gold Hugo – Best Film (Alan Rickman)
Czech Lion (Czech Republic)
Nominated: Best Foreign Language Film (Alan Rickman)
European Film Awards
Nominated: Best Actress (Emma Thompson)
Venice Film Festival (Italy)
Won: 'CinemAvvenire' Award  (Alan Rickman; tied with A Ostra e o Vento and Giro di lune tra terra e mare).
Won: OCIC Award (Alan Rickman)
Won: Pasinetti Award – Best Actress (Emma Thompson)
Nominated: Golden Lion (Alan Rickman)

References

External links
 
 
 

1997 films
1997 drama films
British drama films
Films directed by Alan Rickman
Films scored by Michael Kamen
Films set in Scotland
1997 directorial debut films
Films about mother–daughter relationships
1990s English-language films
1990s British films